Duke of Normandy (pigeon number NURP 41 SBC 219) was a pigeon who received the Dickin Medal in 1947 from the People's Dispensary for Sick Animals for bravery in service during the Second World War. Duke of Normandy was the first bird to arrive back with a message from the paratroops of 21st Army Group on D-Day (6 June 1944) after the capture of a gun battery at Merville.

See also 
List of individual birds

References

External links
 PDSA Dickin Medal

Recipients of the Dickin Medal
Individual domesticated pigeons